Sabkhat al-Jabbūl or Mamlahat al-Jabbūl or Lake Jabbūl is a large, traditionally seasonal, saline lake and concurrent salt flats  (sabkha) 30 km southeast of Aleppo, Syria, in the Bāb District of Aleppo Governorate. It is the largest natural lake in Syria and the second largest lake after the artificial Lake Assad. The salt flats are extensive. The area includes the Sabkhat al-Jabbul Nature Reserve, a protected waterfowl site.

Today the Sabkhat al-Jabbul exists within a closed basin, but during the Pleistocene the basin filled,  overflowed and formed a tributary of the Euphrates. The lake traditionally flooded in the spring, shrinking back during the summer and autumn.

Resource use
Primary uses of the area include tourism, waterfowl hunting, livestock grazing on the surrounding steppe and salt extraction.  Al-Jubbul is the major source of salt in Syria, other sources include Lake Jayrud, Rif Dimashq Governorate, to the northeast of Damascus and Lake Khatuniyah (Khatunia), Al-Hasakah Governorate, to the northeast of Al-Hasakah, near the village of Al Hawi and the Iraqi border.

Notes

Further reading
 Evans, Michael I. (editor) (1994) Important Bird Areas in the Middle East (BirdLife Conservation Series No.2.) BirdLife International, Cambridge, England,

External links

 "Jabbul Salty Lake سبخة جبول" photograph from Panoramio
 "Jabbul Salty Lake" photographs from Syria Looks

Salt flats
Bird sanctuaries
Ramsar sites in Syria
Lakes of Syria
Aleppo Governorate
Saline lakes of Asia